Chorisops caroli, is a European species of soldier fly.

Distribution
Italy.

References

Stratiomyidae
Diptera of Europe
Endemic fauna of Italy
Insects described in 1995